Jesse Hawley may refer to:

 Jesse Hawley (merchant) (fl. early 19th century), American entrepreneur and activist
 Jesse Hawley (American football) (1887–1946), American football coach